The discography of American indie pop band Muna comprises three studio albums, six extended plays, sixteen singles, and fifteen music video. The trio released two studio albums with RCA Records, About U (2017) and Saves the World (2019), before signing with independent label Saddest Factory Records. Their self-titled third studio album was released on June 24, 2022.

Studio albums

Extended plays

Singles

Remixes

Guest appearances

Music videos

References

Discographies of American artists
Pop music discographies